Étang de la Brienne (or Lac de Planèzes) is a lake of Luc-la-Primaube in Aveyron, France. At an elevation of 640 m, its surface area is 0.105 km2.

Brienne